Greg Rzab (born 1959, Chicago, Illinois, United States) is an American bass guitar player.

Greg played for several years  with Otis Rush's band, with Buddy Guy's band (1986-1998), and has also had a number of stints, tours, sessions, and records with other famous blues performers. In 2000, he was a member of the touring lineup of The Black Crowes and is featured on the bonus tracks of their 2000 album Live at the Greek with Jimmy Page.  He was also a touring member of Gov't Mule for tours in late 2002 and early 2003.

Since 2009 he is a member of a new lineup of the Bluesbreakers.

References

1959 births
Living people
American blues guitarists
American male bass guitarists
Guitarists from Chicago
20th-century American bass guitarists
20th-century American male musicians